Isabella of Ibelin (1241–1324) was queen of Cyprus and Jerusalem by marriage to Hugh III of Cyprus.

Isabella was the daughter of Guy of Ibelin, marshal and constable of the Kingdom of Cyprus. She married Hugh of Antioch, who succeeded his childless cousin Hugh II as king of Cyprus in 1267 thanks to her family's connections. In 1268, her husband became king of Jerusalem too. He died in 1284 and the crowns passed to their sons, first John I and shortly after to Henry II.

When her son Amalric seized power in 1306, Queen Isabella and her brother Philip unsuccessfully supported her older son King Henry. Amalric was murdered on 5 June 1310, and another son, Aimery, was proclaimed governor in his stead. But by 11 June, supporters of the imprisoned king contacted their mother, Queen Isabella, papal representatives, and Aimery's party. Aimery was outnumbered and agreed with his supporters to restore Henry in return for Isabella's promise to persuade Henry to pardon them and to ratify legal transactions they made. Envoys reported to King James II of Aragon, husband of Isabella's daughter Maria, that Isabella and Philip dominated Henry's court in the rest of his reign.

Issue
Isabella and Hugh III had the following children:
 John I (died 1285) who succeeded him as king of Jerusalem and Cyprus
 Bohemond (c. 1268 – Tyre, 3 November 1281, buried at the Franciscan Church of Nicosia)
 Henry II (1271 – 31 August 1324) who succeeded John as king of Jerusalem and Cyprus
 Amalric (died 5 June 1310), constable of Jerusalem, who displaced Henry and became regent of Cyprus
 Maria (1273 – September 1322 at Tortosa and buried at Barcelona), who married King James II of Aragon
 Aimery (1274–1280 — soon before 9 April 1316), succeeded Guy as constable of Cyprus in 1303, briefly succeeded Amalric as regent and governor of Cyprus on 6 June 1310
 Guy (1275–1280 – 1303, probably buried at Nicosia), constable of Cyprus c. 1291, married on 7 December 1291 Eschiva of Ibelin, Lady of Beirut (1253–1312), parents of:
 Hugh IV of Cyprus
 Isabella (1296–1300 – after 1340), married on 21 July 1322 Odo of Dampierre, titular constable of Jerusalem (died 1330)
 Margaret (c. 1276 – in Armenia, 1296), who married  King Thoros III of Armenia
 Alice (1277–1280 – after March 1324), who married 1292–1295 or c. 1292/1294 Balian of Ibelin (died 1315/1316 in Kerynia, soon before 19 April 1316), titular Prince of Galilee and Bethlehem
 Helvis (died after March 1324)
 Isabella (c. 1280 – 1319), who married firstly in 1285/1290 Constantine of Neghir, lord of Partzerpert (died 1308), and secondly c. 1310 King Oshin of Armenia, who divorced her before or in 1316

References

Sources

Cypriot queens consort
Queens consort of Jerusalem
1241 births
1324 deaths
13th-century Cypriot people
Women of the Crusader states
House of Ibelin
14th-century Cypriot people
Queen mothers